US Post Office-Fredonia may refer to:
United States Post Office (Fredonia, Kansas), listed on the NRHP in Kansas
United States Post Office (Fredonia, New York), List of RHPs in NY